Ernest Francillon (born 10 July 1834 in Lausanne), was the Swiss manager of Longines watches and an entrepreneur. He was the nephew of Auguste Agassiz. He died on 3 April 1900 in Saint-Imier, where he founded the factory. A monument to his memory was erected on 13 October 1907.

Swiss watchmakers (people)
1834 births
1900 deaths